Garcinia benthamiana, also known as asashi, is a flowering tree in the family Clusiaceae or Guttiferae. The specific epithet (benthamiana) honors English botanist George Bentham.

Distribution
Garcinia benthamiana is native to central Brazil, northern Peru, Guyana, Suriname, and French Guiana.

Description
Its leaves are elliptical in shape and its bark is rough and dark red-brown in color, usually covered in a green or white mold. It is a dioecious and evergreen tree.

See also
List of Garcinia species

References

benthamiana
Flora of South America
Trees of northern South America
Trees of the Amazon
Trees of western South America
Taxa named by John J. Pipoly III
Plants described in 2008